The Teenage Workbook is a humour fiction novel by Adrian Tan, first published by Hotspot Books in 1989. The book is the sequel to The Teenage Textbook (published in 1988). Both novels focused on the lives of four students studying at the fictitious Paya Lebar Junior College in Singapore.

Singaporean novels
Novels set in Singapore
1989 novels